First Baptist Church of Elkridge, is a historic African American Church located at 5795 Paradise Ave in Elkridge, Maryland.

The building was constructed in 1877.

See also
Asbury Methodist Episcopal Church (Annapolis Junction, Maryland)
Brown Chapel United Methodist Church
Locust United Methodist Church
Mt. Moriah Lodge No. 7
St. Stephens African Methodist Episcopal Church

References

African-American history of Howard County, Maryland
Howard County, Maryland landmarks
Elkridge, Maryland
Churches completed in 1877
1877 establishments in Maryland